Mayumba is a Vili- and Shira-speaking town of about 5,208 people on the Atlantic Ocean coast of Gabon, at the end of the N6 road, lying on a peninsula separated from the mainland by the Banio Lagoon.

Description
It is known for its long sandy beach where leatherback turtles nest. The most common ethnic groups are Vili, Lumbu, and Punu, and locals of Mayumba town call themselves 'Mayesiens'. It is home to an airport, several small restaurants, and a market. There are seven primary schools in the area, and one junior high school of about 500 students.

Mayumba town is nestled among three small hills separating the lagoon from the ocean.  Sleepy at the best of times, its two main streets only come to life at twilight when the townspeople meander past the market and a scattered small bars, exchanging greetings and the news of the day.  It is a time to catch up, sip a cold beer and enjoy the cool of the evening. Instead of the roar of traffic, you are serenaded by the melodies of southern Gabon’s singing celebrity Annie-Flore Batchielillys, or at least a chorus of ardent local fans.

Oysters are part of Mayesien life. Each dry season (June to September) salt water floods in from the ocean, turning the lagoon near Mayumba clear and salty.  This has two exciting effects. First, the clear sea water cleans the oyster beds near the lagoon mouth, making this wonderful seafood deliciously palatable. Secondly, the greater water visibility permits locals to dive for oysters and take them back for sale at Mayumba’s market.  Oysters are purchased alive or already cooked ‘kebab’ style.  Visitors can even try their hand at diving for an oyster (the usual depth of the water is only 3 meters (10 feet)) after which the diving party retires to the beach front where the oysters are grilled in their shells on open fires.

Mayumba is home to a very relaxed pace of life, but for those with energy to spare after a hard morning of tanning, swimming or sampling the local seafood, there are several good walks to be had in and around the town, with excellent views of the lagoon and the ocean.  The seashore itself draws walkers like a magnet, and the wild coast to the immediate south of the town offers hiking limited only by your own stamina. Return home through the savannah for the chance to catch a glimpse of a rare bird or a sitatunga antelope.

Climate 
Mayumba has a tropical savanna climate (Köppen climate classification Aw).

References

Populated places in Nyanga Province